The Flight 93 National Memorial is a memorial built to commemorate the crash of United Airlines Flight 93, which was one of four aircraft hijacked during the September 11 attacks in 2001. The memorial is located in Somerset County, Pennsylvania, with the vast majority in Stonycreek Township, and with a small portion in Shade Township.

A national memorial was created to honor the passengers and crew of Flight 93, who stopped the terrorists from reaching their target by fighting the hijackers. A temporary memorial to the 40 victims was established soon after the crash. The first phase of the permanent memorial was completed, opened, and dedicated on September 10, 2011. The design for the memorial is a modified version of the entry Crescent of Embrace by Paul and Milena Murdoch.

A concrete and glass visitor center opened on September 10, 2015, situated on a hill overlooking the crash site and the white marble Wall of Names. An observation platform at the visitor center and the white marble wall are both aligned beneath the path of Flight 93.

United Airlines Flight 93

Of the four aircraft hijacked on September 11, 2001, United Airlines Flight 93 is the only one that did not reach the hijackers’ intended target, presumed to be the United States Capitol in Washington, D.C. Several passengers and crew members made cellular telephone calls from the plane and learned about the attacks on the World Trade Center in New York City and the Pentagon in Arlington County, Virginia. As a result, the passengers and crew members decided to mount an assault in order to retake control of the aircraft from the hijackers.

Temporary memorial

The crash site was enclosed by a fence and closed to the public except for victims' family members. The temporary memorial was located on a hillside  from the crash site. The memorial included a  chain-link fenceits length commemorating the 40 passengers and crewon which visitors could leave flowers, flags, hats, rosaries, and other items. The items were collected by the National Park Service.

Many cities wanted to memorialize the heroes of United Flight 93. Among the first was Marshall, Texas, which by order of the City Commission, named a street "United Flight 93" in early 2002. The keynote speaker was Barbara Catuzzi, the mother of victim Lauren Grandcolas.

Next to the fence were several memorials including a bronze plaque of names, flags, and a large cross. The temporary memorial also included a row of small wooden angels, one for each passenger or crew member. There were also handwritten messages on the guardrails at the memorial. At the memorial site, there was also a small building where visitors could sign a guestbook. The building was staffed by National Park Service volunteers, called ambassadors, who answered questions. In the years following the attacks, approximately 150,000 visitors each year came to the memorial site, a number that reached nearly a million people as of July 2008.

The temporary memorial, for years on land leased for the memorial by Svonavec, Inc., a coal company based in Somerset, Pennsylvania, was moved in 2008 because the company did not renew the lease. It was moved across the road on land that is part of about  that the Families of Flight 93 foundation bought in 2008.

Permanent memorial

On March 7, 2002, Congressman John Murtha (PA-12) introduced a bill in the United States House of Representatives to establish a National Memorial to be developed by a commission, and ultimately administered by the National Park Service. On April 16, 2002, Senator Arlen Specter (PA) introduced a version of the "Flight 93 National Memorial Act" in the Senate. On September 10, 2002, the bill passed both houses of Congress. The final bill specifically excluded the four hijackers from being memorialized. When signed by President George W. Bush on September 24, 2002, it became Public Law No. 107-226, and the site was listed on the National Register of Historic Places. By September 2005, the Flight 93 Advisory Commission was required to send to the Secretary of the Interior and Congress recommendations for the planning, design, construction, and long-term management of a permanent memorial. The Act also provided for the purchase of any required land from willing sellers.

The Flight 93 National Memorial Campaign is a partnership among the Families of Flight 93, the Flight 93 Federal Advisory Commission, the Flight 93 Memorial Task Force, the National Park Service, the National Park Foundation and many representatives of local, state and national organizations, agencies and interests, as well as people from around the world to build a permanent memorial. Launched in 2005, this public-private partnership sought to raise $30 million from philanthropic individuals, corporations and foundations to enable the construction of the Flight 93 National Memorial. After 14 years of planning and development, the Flight 93 National Memorial was completed and opened to family members of the victims on September 10, 2015.

Land acquisition 
The boundaries of the National Memorial extend from Lambertsville Road to U.S. Route 30 (Lincoln Highway), where the entrance is located. The memorial site itself is a  bowl-shaped area, with  surrounding as a buffer. In December 2002, landowner Tim Lambert donated  at the crash site and entered discussions with the Conservation Fund regarding an additional . Using some funds donated from receipts for the film United 93, the Families of Flight 93 organization purchased  in the summer of 2006. The organization sought $10 million in federal funding to use for acquiring land. In November 2006, the Conservation Fund acquired  as buffer land, to be managed by the Pennsylvania Game Commission. PBS Coals Inc. sold  to the families' organization in March 2008.

Svonavec, Inc. owned a  parcel, which was a reclaimed strip-mine. Michael Svonavec, working with appraiser Randall Bell, submitted a letter to the National Park Service in November 2003 with plans to build a museum and visitor's center on his land. Although the other property owners had sold their land for the memorial, Svonavec believed that the crash had increased the property value of its land to $23.3M, while the government only recognized the land as being worth its original value of $610,000. The Flight 93 Advisory Committee and the Families of Flight 93 wrote a letter to President George W. Bush, asking him to issue an Executive Order which would authorize the use of eminent domain to secure the land. Instead, Pennsylvania Senators pushed an amendment through Congress which allowed the Department of the Interior to seize the land by eminent domain. The question of compensation was unsolved, and so the case of United States v 275.81 Acres of Land was brought before a federal district court to determine proper compensation for the property. The court-appointed Commission concluded that the appropriate compensation was $1,535,000.

Design competition

Design selection

The commission decided to select the design for the memorial through a multi-stage design competition funded by grants from the Heinz Foundations and the John S. and James L. Knight Foundation. The competition began on September 11, 2004; over 1,000 entries were submitted online. In February 2005, five finalists were selected for further development and consideration. The 15-member final jury included family members, design and art professionals, and community and national leaders. After three days of review and debate, they announced the winner on September 7, 2005: Crescent of Embrace by a design team led by Paul and Milena Murdoch of Los Angeles.

The design featured a "Tower of Voices," containing 40 wind chimesone for each passenger and crew member who died. A crescent would have been formed by a circular pathway lined with red maple trees that follows the natural bowl shape of the land. Forty groves of red and sugar maples and eastern white oak trees were to be planted behind the crescent. A black slate wall would mark the edge of the crash site, where the victims are buried.

Bloggers and religious groups criticized the new design. Jury member Tom Burnett Sr., whose son was killed in the crash, said he made an impassioned speech to his fellow jurors about what he felt the crescent represented. "I explained this goes back centuries as an old-time Islamic symbol ... I told them we'd be a laughing stock if we did this", Burnett said. Representative Tom Tancredo of Colorado opposed the design's shape "because of the crescent's prominent use as a symbol in Islam". Mike Rosen of the Rocky Mountain News wrote: "On the anniversaries of 9/11, it's not hard to visualize al-Qaeda celebrating the crescent of maple trees, turning red in the fall, "embracing" the Flight 93 crash site. To them, it would be a memorial to their fallen martyrs. Why invite that? Just come up with a different design that eliminates the double meaning and the dispute". The architect asserted that the alignment was coincidental and that there was no intent to refer to Muslim symbols, with which several victims' families agreed. Al-Qaeda and its affiliated Jihadist groups belong to the Salafi movement, which generally does not consider the crescent to be a symbol of Islam, viewing it as a later innovation of purportedly less pious empires.

Others criticized the design as too non-representational. James Lileks, a journalist and architectural commentator, wrote:

Modified design

In response to criticism, the designer agreed to modify the plan. The architect believes that the central elements can be maintained to satisfy criticism. "It's a disappointment there is a misinterpretation and a simplistic distortion of this, but if that is a public concern, then that is something we will look to resolve in a way that keeps the essential qualities", Murdoch said in a telephone interview to the Associated Press.

The redesigned memorial has the plain shape of a circle, as opposed to a crescent. The circle's design is bisected by the flight's trajectory, which is marked by a clearing in the trees. The new design was supposed to emphasize the area of impact. According to the memorial's architect, Paul Murdoch:

Construction

Phase 1: Wall of Names

The cost of the permanent memorial is estimated at $60 million. As of March 2011, $20 million in private donations had been raised, the Commonwealth of Pennsylvania was providing $18.5 million, and Congress had appropriated $10 million; the families of the victims of Flight 93 urged Congress to appropriate $3.7 million more in the fiscal year 2012 budget. The permanent memorial was originally planned for dedication on September 11, 2011; however, the pace of construction was delayed due to, among other factors, shortage of funding and the general economic downturn in America.

Ground was broken on November 8, 2009, at a ceremony led by Secretary of the Interior Ken Salazar and attended by Governor Ed Rendell, Senator Bob Casey, and Representatives John Murtha and Bill Shuster, as well as National Park officials, first responders, and family members of the passengers. The Wall of Names was completed in 2011.

Phase 2: Tower of Voices
In 2017, construction of a -tall monumental "Tower of Voices" began. The tower contains 40 wind chimesone for each passenger and crew member who died in the crash, but none for the terrorists as they were responsible for the hijacking. The tower forms the gateway to the National Memorial and is visible from U.S. Route 30. The pitch of the chimes was conceived by composer Samuel Pellman and constructed by a wind engineering consultant, an acoustics engineer, and a musical instruments fabricator. Prototypes were tested in Simi Valley, California, Morton, Illinois, and the desert in Arizonasites with similar wind conditions as the memorial, which is located in an area of relatively high average wind speeds and has wind farms nearby.

Construction of the main tower was completed in 2018 and eight of the forty wind chimes were installed. In September 2020, the remaining wind chimes were installed by ARCH Production & Design NYC along with the mechanism that allows them to ring.

Dedication

The first phase of the memorial was dedicated on September 10, 2011, at a public ceremony attended by Vice President Joe Biden, former presidents George W. Bush and Bill Clinton, Speaker of the House John Boehner, other dignitaries and family members of the passengers, and thousands of others. During the ceremony, Clinton announced that he and Boehner would launch a fundraising effort to raise the $10 million required to complete the memorial.  Singer/songwriter Sarah McLachlan performed both "Angel" and "I Will Remember You" at the dedication ceremony. The Bells of Remembrance were tolled 40 times, once for each of the passengers and crew as their names were read, a tradition from the annual September 11 observance.

The Tower of Voices was dedicated on September 9, 2018.

See also
 U.S. Route 219 in Pennsylvania – a portion of this highway, running close to the crash site, was co-signed as the Flight 93 Memorial Highway in 2007.
 National September 11 Memorial & Museum
 Pentagon Memorial
 Victims of Terrorist Attack on the Pentagon Memorial
 List of national memorials of the United States

References

External links

 
 Flight 93 National Memorial Campaign
 Brief bios of passengers and crewmembers 
 Public Law No. 107-226
 Pennsylvania memorial

Monuments and memorials on the National Register of Historic Places in Pennsylvania
National Register of Historic Places in Somerset County, Pennsylvania
Protected areas established in 2002
National Memorials of the United States
Memorials for the September 11 attacks
National Park Service areas in Pennsylvania
Protected areas of Somerset County, Pennsylvania
Tourist attractions in Somerset County, Pennsylvania
Monuments and memorials in Pennsylvania
Acts of the 107th United States Congress
2002 establishments in Pennsylvania
United Airlines Flight 93